Pierlot is a French surname. Notable people with the surname include:

Hubert Pierlot (1883–1963), Belgian Prime Minister between 1939 and 1945
Francis Pierlot (1875–1955), American film actor
Philippe Pierlot (born 1958), Belgian viol player and conductor
Pierre Pierlot (1921–2007), French classical oboist

French-language surnames